The following is a list of positions with the title Under Secretary or Under-Secretary.

United Kingdom

Government ministerial positions 
Parliamentary Under-Secretary of State § Current Parliamentary Under Secretaries of State

Former government ministerial positions 

 Under-Secretary of State for Foreign and Commonwealth Affairs was formed in 1968 by the merging of
 Under-Secretary of State for Foreign Affairs
 Under-Secretary of State for Commonwealth Affairs
 which was the merging of, in 1966, the
 Under-Secretary of State for the Colonies at the Colonial Office
 Under-Secretary of State for Commonwealth Relations
 which was originally
 Under-Secretary of State for Dominion Affairs
 Under-Secretary of State for War and the Colonies, which was the result of the 1801 merger of the
 Under-Secretary of State for War
 Under-Secretary of State for the Colonies
 Under-Secretary of State for Air at the Air Ministry
 Under-Secretary for Ireland who lived at the Under Secretary's Lodge
 Under-Secretary of State for India at the India Office

Government official positions 

 Permanent Under-Secretary of State § Current permanent secretaries

United States
In the United States, the rank of Under Secretary denotes a high-level civilian official within the United States federal government. An official of sub-Cabinet rank, Under Secretaries are appointed by the President of the United States with the consent of the United States Senate and are assigned to assist a specific Cabinet Secretary. Under Secretaries often manage extensive portfolios within a Cabinet Department.

Under Secretaries are generally Level III positions within the Executive Schedule, ranking below the position of Deputy Secretary and above the position of Assistant Secretary. Since January 2010, the annual rate of pay for Level III is $165,300.

The Associate Attorney General and the Solicitor General, both of the Department of Justice, are ranked equivalent to an Under Secretary.

Department of Agriculture

Under Secretary of Agriculture for Natural Resources and Environment
Under Secretary of Agriculture for Farm Production and Conservation
Under Secretary of Agriculture for Food, Nutrition, and Consumer Services
Under Secretary of Agriculture for Food Safety
Under Secretary of Agriculture for Research, Education, and Economics/Chief Scientist 
Under Secretary of Agriculture for Marketing and Regulatory Programs
Under Secretary of Agriculture for Trade and Foreign Agricultural Affairs

Department of Commerce

Under Secretary of Commerce for Industry and Security
Under Secretary of Commerce for Economic Affairs
Under Secretary of Commerce for International Trade
Under Secretary of Commerce for Oceans and Atmosphere and Administrator of the National Oceanic and Atmospheric Administration
Under Secretary of Commerce for Standards and Technology and Director of the National Institute for Standards and Technology
Under Secretary of Commerce for Intellectual Property and Director of the United States Patent and Trademark Office

Department of Defense

Under Secretary of Defense for Acquisition and Sustainment
Under Secretary of Defense for Research and Engineering
Under Secretary of Defense for Policy
Under Secretary of Defense (Comptroller)/Chief Financial Officer
Under Secretary of Defense for Personnel and Readiness
Under Secretary of Defense for Intelligence

Service Departments
Under Secretary of the Air Force
Under Secretary of the Army
Under Secretary of the Navy

Department of Education

Under Secretary of Education

Department of Energy

Under Secretary of Energy
Under Secretary of Energy for Nuclear Security and Administrator of the National Nuclear Security Administration
Under Secretary of Energy for Science

Department of Homeland Security

Under Secretary of Homeland Security for Science and Technology
Under Secretary of Homeland Security for Intelligence and Analysis and Chief Intelligence Officer
Under Secretary of Homeland Security for Management
Under Secretary of Homeland Security for Strategy, Policy and Plans

Department of State

Under Secretary of State for Political Affairs
Under Secretary of State for Management
Under Secretary of State for Economic Growth, Energy, and the Environment
Under Secretary of State for Public Diplomacy and Public Affairs
Under Secretary of State for Arms Control and International Security
Under Secretary of State for Civilian Security, Democracy, and Human Rights
Counselor of the Department (ranked equivalent to Under Secretary of State]

Department of Transportation

Under Secretary of Transportation for Policy

Department of the Treasury

Under Secretary of the Treasury for International Affairs
Under Secretary of the Treasury for Domestic Finance
Under Secretary of the Treasury for Terrorism and Financial Intelligence

Department of Veterans Affairs

Under Secretary of Veterans Affairs for Health
Under Secretary of Veterans Affairs for Benefits
Under Secretary of Veterans Affairs for Memorial Affairs

United Nations

Under-Secretary-General of the United Nations

Government occupations